Annabel Scholey (born 10 January 1984) is an English actress. She played Lauren Drake in the BBC supernatural drama Being Human (2009) and the leading role of 'Maddie' in the musical feature film Walking on Sunshine (2014). Scholey played Contessina de Medici in the television series, Medici: Masters of Florence (2016) with Dustin Hoffman and Richard Madden. In 2021, she played the major recurring role of Claire Brown in Doctor Who: Flux.

Early life
Scholey was born in Wakefield, West Yorkshire in 1984. She trained at the Oxford School of Drama, graduating in 2005.

Career
Scholey has worked extensively on screen and in theatre. She appeared (July/Aug 2013) in the revival of Passion Play by Peter Nichols (at the Duke of York's Theatre) as the predatory younger woman, Kate. She also worked at The Royal National Theatre in their summer production of Antigone playing the role of Ismene. In June 2011 Scholey played Lady Anne, in Sam Mendes adaptation of Richard III with Kevin Spacey in the title role, at the Old Vic theatre in London and the Brooklyn Academy of Music in New York. The production opened to rave reviews. In 2010, Scholey played Hermia alongside Dame Judi Dench in A Midsummer Night's Dream at The Rose Theatre Kingston and later that year appeared as 'Julia' in Sheridan's The Rivals, alongside Penelope Keith and Peter Bowles (of To the Manor Born) at the Haymarket Theatre in London. Both productions were directed by Sir Peter Hall.

Scholey played the lead role of Michelle 'Midge' Lerner in the BBC Three comedy drama Personal Affairs, alongside Laura Aikman, Ruth Negga, and Maimie McCoy.

She played Diana Rivers in the 2006 BBC television adaptation of Jane Eyre. She has also appeared in episodes of Doctors, George Gently, EastEnders, Holby City, and Poirot.

Her work on radio drama includes All Passion Spent, A Harlot's Progress and Under Milk Wood. Scholey was runner-up in the BBC Carleton Hobbs Radio Competition 2005. In 2011, she provided the voice for Ginny Weasley in the video game version of Harry Potter and the Deathly Hallows – Part 2.

Personal life
In 2017, Scholey married Northern Irish actor and author Ciarán McMenamin.

Filmography

Theatre
The Real Thing, Theatre Royal, Bath and national tour, 2005 (playing Debbie)
Troilus and Cressida, Edinburgh International Festival and RSC, 2006 (playing Cressida)
The Cherry Orchard, Sheffield Crucible, 2007 (playing Anya)
Hobson’s Choice, Chichester Festival Theatre and UK tour, 2007 (playing Vickey Hobson)
Hamlet, Bristol Tobacco Factory, 2008 (playing Ophelia)
The Taming of the Shrew, Bristol Tobacco Factory, 2008 (playing Bianca)
Wallenstein, Chichester Festival Theatre, 2009 (playing Princess Thekla)
The House of Special Purpose, Chichester Festival Theatre, 2009 (playing Olga)
A Midsummer Nights Dream, Rose Theatre, Kingston, 2010 (playing Hermia)
Charley's Aunt, Royal Exchange Theatre, Manchester, 2010 (playing Kitty Verdun)
The Rivals, Haymarket Theatre, London, November 2010February 2011 (playing Julia)
Richard III, Old Vic Theatre, London, JuneSeptember 2011 (playing Lady Anne)
Antigone, Royal National Theatre, London, AprilJuly 2012 (playing Ismene)
Mr Burns, Almeida Theatre, London, May 2014 
High Society, Old Vic Theatre, London, AprilAugust 2015 (playing Liz Imbrie)
The Iliad, British Museum and Almeida Theatre, London, 14 August 2015 (reading)

References

External links

Living people
English stage actresses
English television actresses
21st-century English actresses
English film actresses
Actresses from Yorkshire
Actors from Wakefield
Alumni of the Oxford School of Drama
1984 births